Heather Joy Armitage (later Young, then McClelland; born 17 March 1933) is a retired British sprinter and British record holder for the 100 yards.

Sporting career 
Armitage won her first major title representing Yorkshire in the all England schools 100 yards in 1951 aged 18.  She competed in the 1952 and 1956 Olympics in the 100 m, 200 m and 4×100 m events and won two medals in the relay. Her best individual achievement was sixth place in the 100 m in 1956. In 1958, she won three medals at the 1958 Commonwealth Games in Cardiff including  as the anchor in the English 4 × 110 yards relay team alongside Madeleine Weston, June Paul and anchor Dorothy Hyman that won the gold medal and set a new world record of 45.37 seconds in the process.

Later that year Armitage took 100 m gold at the 1958 European Championships in Athletics in Stockholm, thereby becoming the first British woman to win an individual European track title.    As of August 2017, she still hold the official British Record for the 100 yards.

Personal life 
In the 1950s she married Frank Young, a fellow teacher, and competed as Heather Young. They later divorced, with Armitage marrying the former association football player John McClelland with whom she has a daughter, Alison.

Post athletic career 
She retired from competitions in 1960 and devoted herself to teaching, mostly on religious topics.

References

External links 

 
 
 

1933 births
Living people
English female sprinters
English Olympic medallists
Olympic silver medallists for Great Britain
Athletes (track and field) at the 1952 Summer Olympics
Athletes (track and field) at the 1956 Summer Olympics
Olympic athletes of Great Britain
People educated at Penistone Grammar School
Commonwealth Games medallists in athletics
Olympic bronze medallists for Great Britain
Athletes (track and field) at the 1958 British Empire and Commonwealth Games
Athletes (track and field) at the 1954 British Empire and Commonwealth Games
Commonwealth Games gold medallists for England
Commonwealth Games silver medallists for England
Commonwealth Games bronze medallists for England
European Athletics Championships medalists
Sportspeople from Colombo
Athletes from Yorkshire
Medalists at the 1956 Summer Olympics
Medalists at the 1952 Summer Olympics
Olympic silver medalists in athletics (track and field)
Olympic bronze medalists in athletics (track and field)
Olympic female sprinters
Medallists at the 1954 British Empire and Commonwealth Games
Medallists at the 1958 British Empire and Commonwealth Games